Megacephala quadrisignata is a species of tiger beetle in the subfamily Cicindelinae that was described by Dejean in 1829.

References

quadrisignata
Beetles described in 1829